Miracle is the second special album (or 2.5 album) by BoA, released on September 24, 2002. The album contains Korean versions of BoA's 2002 Japanese songs. The song "Every Heart" was first released in Japan and the Korean version is used as the end theme of anime Inuyasha.

Commercial performance
No.1 Top 50 album in monthly chart
No.22 Best-selling album of 2002 in Korea.

Sales:
+First week sales: ~21,200 copies.

+First month sales: ~91,400 copies.

+Total sales: ~330,350 copies.

Track listing
Promotional songs are in bold.
"기적 (Miracle)"
"Every Heart"
"Valenti"  
"Feelings Deep Inside (마음은 전해진다)"
"Share Your Heart (With Me)"
"Happiness"
"Snow White"
"Nobody But You"
"Next Step"
"Nothing's Gonna Change"
"Listen to My Heart" (bonus track)

BoA albums
2002 compilation albums
SM Entertainment compilation albums
Korean-language compilation albums